Thevitella is a genus of moths of the family Crambidae. It contains only one species, Thevitella alphalis, which is found in Madagascar.

References

Natural History Museum Lepidoptera genus database

Acentropinae
Monotypic moth genera
Taxa named by Pierre Viette
Moths of Africa
Crambidae genera